Villa Schwob also  Villa Turque is a house located in La Chaux-de-Fonds, Switzerland designed by noted architect Le Corbusier.
It was commissioned in 1912 by the watchmaker Anatole Schwob, and completed in 1916.
In 1986, this early masterpiece of Le Corbusier has been acquired by the group Ebel for its 75th anniversary to serve both as a reminder of its core values and as an inexhaustible source of inspiration for the brand.

Design and construction

The villa is built in Oriental style. Le Corbusier used the Regulating Lines design principle in this building for the first time.
This is the best known and most remarkable of his creations in La Chaux-de-Fonds. Rich in symbols, and with elaborate technical and aesthetic aspects, it is also his most accomplished work before leaving for Paris. The ochre brick-work associated with concrete accentuates the oriental character of the house.

References

Le Corbusier buildings
Villas in Switzerland
Cultural property of national significance in the canton of Neuchâtel
La Chaux-de-Fonds